Lucky Me is a 1954 American musical comedy film starring Doris Day, Robert Cummings and Phil Silvers. It was the first musical film produced in the CinemaScope process and filmed in Warnercolor.

Plot
Candy Williams is a member of a struggling vaudeville troupe that is stranded in Miami when creditors take all of their money. After the troupe's leader Hap Schneider tries to scam a restaurant out of dinner, they are forced to work in the hotel to pay for the meal. While cleaning a hallway, Flo Neely hears Dick Carson singing songs for his new Broadway show. She tells Hap and Duke McGee that Dick is staying in the hotel.

Candy has met Dick but believes that he is a mechanic named Eddie. She arranges a date with him but Hap joins them and tells her that Eddie is Dick Carson. Candy leaves thinking that Dick was trying to take advantage of her. To make up for the trouble, Hap arranges a rehearsal of a new song so that Dick can watch the troupe and audition Candy for his show. However, Candy thinks that he is just trying to trick her again. He convinces her that he really wants her to star in the play. However, his backer's daughter Lorraine Thayer is jealous and will not let her father back Dick's show if Candy is in it.

The troupe is leaving the hotel when Dick's manager reveals that he is giving up the show and returning to New York. Candy realizes that Dick really loves her. She returns to her room and disguises herself to surreptitiously enter Otis Thayer's birthday party, where she wants to perform Dick's songs and secure Thayer's backing for the show. The troupe accompanies her and Flo forces Lorraine to fall into a swimming pool so that Candy is free to save the day.

Cast
 Doris Day as Candy Williams
 Robert Cummings as Dick Carson
 Phil Silvers as Hap Schneider
 Eddie Foy, Jr. as Duke McGee
 Nancy Walker as Flo Neely
 Martha Hyer as Lorraine Thayer
 Bill Goodwin as Otis Thayer
 Marcel Dalio as Anton
 Hayden Rorke as Tommy Arthur
 James Burke as Mahoney
Cast notes:
 Day had begun to suffer from panic attacks before filming began and continually delayed the project in spite of pressure exerted by Warner Bros. She was also unhappy with the script, writing in her 1976 autobiography Her Own Story: "Robert Cummings, Phil Silvers, Nancy Walker, and Eddie Foy, Jr., were all talented, funny people, but I knew by now that no amount of talent can overcome an inferior script, especially if it is a comedy." She considered allowing the studio to suspend her rather than appearing in the film, but on the advice of a friend, she fulfilled her contractual obligation. However, the filming process was difficult for her because of the panic attacks.
Angie Dickinson made her debut in the film after having won the chance as the result of a television contest. She has an uncredited bit part in the party scene.
Cummings' singing voice was provided by Hal Derwin.

Production
Although an early announcement promised that the film would be produced in 3-D, it was actually made only in CinemaScope, and was the first musical to use the process.

The role played by Robert Cummings was originally intended for Gordon MacRae, who had previously worked with Doris Day several times. Cummings was cast in September 1953.

In October 1953, Warner Bros. announced that filming would be delayed to allow Day to recover from nervous exhaustion.

Location shooting for the film took place in Miami.

Reception
Lucky Me was not well-received upon its original release.

See also
 Doris Day filmography

References

External links
 
 
 
 

1954 films
Warner Bros. films
Films directed by Jack Donohue
Films shot in Miami
CinemaScope films
American musical comedy films
1954 musical comedy films
1950s English-language films
1950s American films